Looney Tunes: Duck Amuck is a 2007 video-game for the Nintendo DS developed by WayForward and published by Warner Bros Games. Like the cartoon short it is based on, Duck Amuck, it involves an external entity (in this case the player) manipulating Daffy Duck's environment.  In North America and Europe, it was released as a companion game to Looney Tunes: Acme Arsenal, made available on the same day for consoles.

Gameplay 
In this game, the player uses a stylus to compete against Daffy Duck, (voiced by Joe Alaskey), with the goal of making him angry by way of various minigames. The game also features wireless game play which allows players to not only gang up on Daffy as a team, but also battle each other in head-to-head competition. The player can also collect many Looney Tunes character coins, which are hidden in the mini-games in the form of sparkles.

Over fifty mini-games can occur in idle mode (when Daffy stands in front of a blank background).  In some cases, the player must interact with Daffy to get access to mini-games. If the player picks up Daffy and throws him to the right, multi-player mode will be activated. Throwing Daffy to the right will show the player all the gags (mini-games) that have been unlocked. If the player lets go of Daffy when he is in mid-air, he will fall. These are some of the few ways the player can interact with him.

The game ends in a manner similar to the cartoon: Daffy demands to know who is doing all the scenery and messing him up. In a departure from the short's ending, Daffy himself is shown as the animator (replacing Bugs Bunny), playing a Nintendo DS, proclaiming "Well, if you can't beat 'em, BE them!"

In the secret ending however, which is obtained by completing every mini-game at their hardest difficulty and finding every coin, Daffy leaves the player no choice but to annihilate the "nuclear option" by donning the devil costume and "eating" nuclear objects like gasoline and nuclear items before swallowing the match (a gag recycled from the Friz Freleng-directed cartoon Show Biz Bugs). The game ends with Daffy being blown up and becoming a ghost as he declares it "an ending to remember".

Reception 

Looney Tunes: Duck Amuck received mixed to positive reviews. The game has an average score of 66 out of 100 at Metacritic, and 65.66% at GameRankings.

References

External links 
 Page on IGN.com
 Page on Gamespot.com

2007 video games
Nintendo DS games
Nintendo DS-only games
Video games featuring Daffy Duck
Video games developed in the United States
Warner Bros. video games
Cartoon Network video games
WayForward games
Multiplayer and single-player video games